Jamie Buckley Saysell (born 24 July 1965 in Cheltenham), better known by his stage name Jamie Irie, is a reggae artist from Coney Hill, Gloucester, England. His single "Words Can Be So Simple" went straight to number four in the Italian singles chart. He has performed with artists such as Sting, Biggie Smalls and Puff Daddy.

His album Nah Give Up, released in 2014, topped the Juno download sales chart in the roots reggae, lovers rock and one drop category. Later the same year a dub version of the album was released.

Discography

Albums
Words Can Be So Simple (2010)
Nah Give Up (2014)
Nah Give Up Dub (2014)

EPs
Irie Cola EP (2011)

Singles
"Words Can Be So Simple" (2010) - Italy No. 4
"My Sound" (2012)
"2B" (2013)

References

External links 
 Jamie Irie on Myspace

British reggae musicians
Living people
People from Gloucester
Place of birth missing (living people)
1965 births